Joshua Kyle Greer Jr. (born June 13, 1994) is an American professional boxer who held the WBO-NABO bantamweight title in 2019.

Professional career
Greer made his professional debut on September 26, 2015, scoring a second-round technical knockout (TKO) victory over Luis Guerrero at the Celebrity Theater in Phoenix, Arizona.

Greer defeated Nikolai Potapov for the WBO-NABO bantamweight title. He defended his title against former world title challenger Antonio Nieves.

In 2017, his knockout of James Gordon-Smith was a finalist for espn.com knockout of the year.

References

External links

Living people
1994 births
Bantamweight boxers
Super-bantamweight boxers
American male boxers
African-American boxers
Boxers from Chicago
21st-century African-American sportspeople